South Korea competed in the 2012 Summer Paralympics in London, United Kingdom, from 29 August to 9 September 2012.

Medalists

Archery 

Men

|-
|align=left|Ouk Soo Lee
|align=left|Men's individual compound open
|647
|14
|L 3-7
|colspan=5|did not advance
|-
|align=left|Jung Young Joo
|align=left rowspan=3|Men's individual recurve W1/W2
|607
|6
|
|W 6-2
|L 4-6
|colspan=3|did not advance
|-
|align=left|Lee Myeong-Gu
|610
|5
|
|W 6-0
|L 4-6
|colspan=3|did not advance
|-
|align=left|You In Sik
|581
|14
|L 2-6
|colspan=5|did not advance
|-
|align=left|Jung Young Joo Kim Suk Ho Lee Myeong-Gu
|align=left|Men's team recurve
|1811
|5
|colspan=2 
|W 195-192
|W 197-190
|L 200-206
|
|}

Women

|-
|align=left|Ko Hee Sook
|align=left|Women's individual recurve W1/W2
|548
|5
|
|L 2-6
|colspan=4|did not advance
|-
|align=left|Lee Hwa Sook
|align=left rowspan=2|Women's individual recurve standing
|555
|4
|
|W 6-0
|W 6-4
|W 7-3
|L 4-6
|
|-
|align=left|Kim Ran Sook
|536
|7
|
|L 4-6
|colspan=4|did not advance
|-
|align=left|Kim Ran Sook Ko Hee Sook Lee Hwa Sook
|align=left|Women's team recurve
|1639
|3
|colspan=2 
|W 188-153
|W 192-186
|W 199-193
|
|}

Athletics

Men's track

Women's track

Women's field

Boccia

Pairs and team events

Cycling 

Road cycling

Track cycling

Goalball 

South Korea qualified a men's team of six players.

Men's tournament

Group B

Judo

Powerlifting 

Men

Women

Rowing

Shooting 

Men

Women

Swimming 

Men

Women

Table tennis

Men

Women

Teams

Wheelchair Fencing

Wheelchair Tennis 

Men

Women

See also
 South Korea at the Paralympics
 South Korea at the 2012 Summer Olympics

References

Nations at the 2012 Summer Paralympics
2012
Summer Paralympics